Jean-Marie Runiga Lugerero is an evangelical bishop and the former President of the March 23 Movement (M23), a rebel military faction in the Democratic Republic of the Congo, which took control of the eastern city of Goma in November, 2012. He previously rejected a deadline by a regional summit in Uganda for the M23 movement to withdraw from Goma saying "withdrawal from Goma should not be a prerequisite for talks but rather should come as the result of talks". M23 withdrew from Goma in December following negotiations. He was sacked from the movement after he signed an accord on February 24 pledging to end the conflict. In a statement signed by M23's military leader, Sultani Makenga, he was accused of treason because of "financial embezzlement, divisions, ethnic hatred, deceit and political immaturity". A faction of the M23 loyal to him, including M23 founder Bosco Ntaganda, have clashed with those loyal to Sultani Makenga.

See also
Sultani Makenga
Bosco Ntaganda

References

Living people
Democratic Republic of the Congo politicians
Democratic Republic of the Congo bishops
People of the M23 rebellion
Democratic Republic of the Congo rebels
Year of birth missing (living people)
21st-century Democratic Republic of the Congo people